Imd or IMD may refer to:

As a word 
 Imd, a giantess in Norse mythology, one of the nine Mothers of Heimdall

As an initialism

Institution or location
 India Meteorological Department, the Indian government agency for meteorology and seismology
 Indian Medical Department, the name of the medical department of the Indian army in 19th-20th century
 Interactive Media Division, a division of the School of Cinematic Art, the University of Southern California, Los Angeles, California, USA
 International Institute for Management Development (IMD), a business school located in Lausanne, Switzerland
 International MTM Directorate, a federation of national MTM (methods-time measurement) associations
 Internationales Musikinstitut Darmstadt, the organization responsible for the Darmstädter Ferienkurse

Medicine 
 Immune-mediated disease, any immune disorder or any disease secondary to immune responses
 Inherited metabolic disorder, an inborn error of metabolism from inherited mutation (as opposed to one from de novo mutation)
 Immunomodulatory drug (immunomodulator), a drug that adjusts immune function (Immunotherapy § Immunomodulators)
 Immunodeficiency, weakness of the immune system
 Immune-mediated diabetes, any type of diabetes with immune responses as a major causative factor
 Immunizing dose, the dose sufficient to immunize (and IMD50 is the median value)
 The Immune deficiency pathway (Imd pathway) of insects

Technology 

 Indigo Magic Desktop, the default Desktop Environment for IRIX (a UNIX variant by Silicon Graphics), in versions 5.1–6.4
 Insulation monitoring device, a protection device or circuit in electric systems
 Intermodulation distortion, the result of two (or more) signals of different frequencies being mixed together in a signal processing path, forming additional, unwanted signals

Other 
 Illinois Medical District, a special-use zoning district on the Near West Side of Chicago, Illinois, USA
 Index of Multiple Deprivation
 International Management District in Greater Houston
 International Media Distribution
 International Men's Day, an international event
 International Museum Day, a celebration that is held each year on or about 18 May